Derwin Maurice Kitchen (born May 14, 1986) is an American professional basketball player. He played college basketball for Iowa Western Community College and Florida State University before playing professionally in Israel, Greece, Serbia, France and Turkey.

Early life and college career
Kitchen graduated from Raines High School, in his hometown of Jacksonville, Florida, in 2005. Afterwards, he considered playing college basketball at several colleges, and initially agreed to play at the University of Florida, with the Florida Gators, but was ruled ineligible for the 2005-06 season due to his academics. He wanted to play college basketball during the 2006-07 season with St. Johns' college basketball team, the St. John's Red Storm, but was again ruled academically ineligible.

During the 2007-08 season, Kitchen played for Iowa Western Community College's college basketball team, where he averaged 14 points, 6.1 rebounds, and 3.3 assists per game. Then, he went on to play with Florida State's team, the Seminoles, for three seasons. He went undrafted at the 2011 NBA Draft.

Professional career

Maccabi Rishon LeZion (2011–2012)
On July 20, 2011, Kitchen started his professional career with the Israeli team Maccabi Rishon LeZion, signing a one-year deal. On January 1, 2012, Kitchen recorded a career-high 35 points, shooting 13-of-17 from the field, along with nine rebounds, and five assists in an 88–77 win over Hapoel Holon. On February 1, 2012, Kitchen was named Israeli League Player of the Month for games played in January.

Kitchen helped Rishon LeZion to reach the Israeli State Cup Finals, where they eventually lost to Maccabi Tel Aviv. In 32 games played during the 2011–12 season, Kitchen averaged 14.9 points, 7.0 rebounds, 3.3 assists, and 1.8 steals per game. On May 17, 2012, Kitchen was named All-Israeli League First Team.

Panathinaikos / Cedevita (2012–2013)
On July 12, 2012, Kitchen joined the Denver Nuggets for the 2012 NBA Summer League. One month later, Kitchen signed a one-year deal with Panathinaikos of the Greek League and the EuroLeague. However, on December 24, 2012, Kitchen was loaned to KK Cedevita for the rest of the season.

Hapoel Jerusalem (2013–2015)
On August 8, 2013, Kitchen returned to Israel for a second stint, signing a one-year deal with Hapoel Jerusalem. On June 23, 2014, Kitchen signed a two-year contract extension with Jerusalem. Kitchen helped Jerusalem to win the 2015 Israeli League Championship.

Nancy / Trabzonspor (2015–2016)
On November 20, 2015, Kitchen signed with the French team SLUC Nancy for the 2015–16 season. However, on December 28, 2015, Kitchen parted ways with Nancy after appearing in seven games and signed with the Turkish team Trabzonspor for the rest of the season.

Ironi Nahariya (2016–2017)
On November 2, 2016, Kitchen returned to Israel for a third stint, signing a one-year deal with Ironi Nahariya. On February 8, 2017, Kitchen recorded a season-high 23 points, shooting 10-of-14 from the field along with eight rebounds, eight assists and three steals in a 96–75 win over Gaziantep.

Kitchen finished the season as the Israeli League third leading player in assists (5.8 per game) and helped Nahariya to reach the 2017 FIBA Europe Cup Quarterfinals and the 2017 Israeli League Quarterfinals.

Hapoel Eilat (2017–2018)
On November 24, 2017, Kitchen signed with Hapoel Eilat for the 2017–18 season. Kitchen helped Eilat to reach the 2018 Israeli League Playoffs, where they eventually lost to Hapoel Holon.

Personal life
Kitchen's first cousin and best friend is Jamon Gordon.

Career statistics

Eurocup

|-
| style="text-align:left;"| 2013-14
| style="text-align:left;" rowspan=2|  Hapoel Jerusalem
| 19 || 19 || 31.5 || .497 || .343 || .828 || 5.3 || 4.0 || 1.3 || .2 || 11.4 || 17.1
|-
| style="text-align:left;"| 2014-15
| 9 || 9 || 30.2 || .486 || .176 || .857 || 5.6 || 3.6 || 1.4 || .2 || 10.3 || 14.0
|-
| style="text-align:left;" rowspan=2| 2015-16
| style="text-align:left;" rowspan=1|  Nancy
| 5 || 5 || 31.6 || .404 || .250 || .789 || 7.6 || 4.6 || 2.4 || 0 || 11.4 || 18.2
|-
| style="text-align:left;" rowspan=1|  Trabzonspor
| 6 || 6 || 28.2 || .353 || .125 || .727 || 7.0 || 4.5 || 1.1 || 0 || 5.5 || 11.2
|-

References

External links
 Euroleague.net Profile
 Eurobasket.com Profile
 RealGM.com Profile
 Draftexpress.com Profile
 FIBA.com Profile
 Florida State Seminoles' College Bio
 ESPN.com College Profile

1986 births
Living people
American expatriate basketball people in Croatia
American expatriate basketball people in Greece
American expatriate basketball people in France
American expatriate basketball people in Israel
American expatriate basketball people in Turkey
American men's basketball players
Basketball players from Jacksonville, Florida
Florida State Seminoles men's basketball players
Hapoel Eilat basketball players
Hapoel Jerusalem B.C. players
Iowa Western Reivers men's basketball players
Ironi Nahariya players
KK Cedevita players
Maccabi Rishon LeZion basketball players
Panathinaikos B.C. players
Point guards
Shooting guards
SLUC Nancy Basket players
Trabzonspor B.K. players